Sakti may refer to:

 Shakti, the primordial cosmic energy in Hinduism
 Sakti, Chhattisgarh, a town in India
 Sakti State, a former princely state in India
 Sakti, Leh, a village in India
 ST Sakti, a tugboat
 Sakti Burman, Indian artist
 Bima Sakti, Indonesian footballer
 Gusti Panji Sakti, King of Buleleng, in present-day Indonesia